John Joseph of Austria or John of Austria (the Younger) (7 April 1629 – 17 September 1679) was a Spanish general and political figure. He was the only illegitimate son of Philip IV of Spain to be acknowledged by the King and trained for military command and political administration. Don John advanced the causes of the Spanish Crown militarily and diplomatically at Naples, Sicily, Catalonia, the Netherlands, Portugal, Dunkirk, and other fronts.  He was the governor of the Southern Netherlands from 1656 to 1659. He remained a popular hero even as the fortunes of Imperial Spain began to decline. His feuds with his father's widow, Queen Mariana of Austria, led to a 1677 palace coup through which he exiled Mariana and took control of the monarchy of his half-brother Charles II of Spain. However, he proved far from the saviour Spain had hoped he would be. He remained in power until his death in 1679.

Early life

His mother was María Calderón (La Calderona), a popular actress, who was forced into a convent shortly after his birth. He was raised in León by a woman of modest circumstances who likely did not know his parentage, though he received "a careful education" at Ocaña (Toledo). In 1642, the King recognized him officially as his son, and John began his life's career as a military representative of his father's interests.

Military career
Don John was sent in 1647 to Naples, then in the throes of the popular rising first led by Masaniello, with a naval squadron and a military force, to support the viceroy. There he played a waiting game.  While the Duke of Arcos 
inserted agents, Don John surrounded the seething city with his forces until the exhaustion of the insurgents and the follies of their French leader, Henry II, Duke of Guise allowed him to move in, crush the remains of the revolt and drive out the, by then, despised French.

He was next sent as viceroy to Sicily, whence he was recalled in 1651 to complete the pacification of Catalonia, which had been in revolt since 1640. On the way to Catalonia to assume his position, he captured the French galleon Lion Couronné, with a squadron of galleys that he had under his command. The high-handedness of the French, whom the Catalans had called in to help their revolt, had produced a reaction, and many switched their loyalties back to the Spanish King. By the time Don John assumed command, most of Catalonia had been recovered and he had not much more to do than to preside over the final siege of Barcelona and the convention which terminated the revolt in October 1652.

On both occasions, he played the peacemaker, and this sympathetic part, combined with his own pleasant manners, engaging personality, and a handsome person with bright eyes made him a popular royal favourite. In 1656, he was sent to command in Flanders, then in revolt against his own sovereign. At the storming of the French camp at Battle of Valenciennes (1656) in 1656, Don Juan Jose displayed great personal courage at the head of a brilliantly executed cavalry charge that caught the French totally by surprise. When, however, he took a part in the leadership of the army at the battle of the Dunes, fought against the French under Turenne and the British forces sent by Cromwell, he was decisively defeated and failed to raise the siege of Dunkirk, in spite of the efforts of Condé, whose invaluable advice he neglected, and the stubborn fight put up by his own troops.

During 1661 and 1662, he fought against the Portuguese in Extremadura. The Spanish troops were ill-supplied and irregularly paid and in a rugged, hostile country. Morale was poor and they were untrustworthy but they were superior in numbers and some successes were gained. If Don John had not suffered from the indolence which Clarendon considered his chief defect, the Portuguese might have been hard-pressed. John's forces overran the greater part of southern Portugal, but in 1663, with the Portuguese forces reinforced by a body of English troops, and  put under the command of the Huguenot Schomberg, Don John was completely beaten  at Ameixial.

Even so, he might not have lost the confidence of his father, if Queen Mariana, mother of the sickly Infante Charles, the only surviving legitimate son of the king, had not regarded him with distrust and dislike. Don John was removed from command and sent to his command at Consuegra.

Opposition to Queen Mariana of Spain
After the death of Philip IV in 1665, Don John became the recognized leader of the opposition to the government of Philip's widow, the regent. She and her favourite, the German Jesuit Juan Everardo Nithard, seized and put to death one of his most trusted servants, Don Jose Malladas.

Don John, in return, put himself at the head of a rising of Aragon and Catalonia, which led to the expulsion of Nithard on 25 February 1669. Don John was, however, forced to content himself with the viceroyalty of Aragon. In 1677, the queen mother aroused universal opposition by her shameless favour for Fernando de Valenzuela. Don John was able to drive her from court, and establish himself as prime minister. Great hopes were entertained for his administration, but it proved disappointing and short; Don John died, perhaps by poison, on 17 September 1679.

Popish Plot
His name featured prominently in the Popish Plot fabricated by the notorious informer Titus Oates in England in 1678. Oates unwisely claimed to have met Don John in Madrid; when questioned closely by Charles II of England, who had met Don John in Brussels in 1656, it became clear that Oates had no idea what he looked like, confirming the King's suspicion that the Plot was an invention.

Ancestry

References
Dunlop, John C. 1834. Memoirs of Spain during the Reigns of Philip IV. and Charles II. from 1621 to 1700, vol. II. Thomas Clark: Edinburgh.
Stolicka, Ondrej. Different German Perspectives on Spanish Politics in the 1670s: The Reaction of Vienna and Berlin on the Coup of Juan José de Austria in the Year 1677, JEHM 23(4), 2019, pp. 367–385.

Notes

1629 births
1679 deaths
17th-century House of Habsburg
Burials in the Pantheon of Infantes at El Escorial
Governors of the Habsburg Netherlands
Illegitimate children of Portuguese monarchs
Illegitimate children of Spanish monarchs
Military personnel of the Franco-Spanish War (1635–1659)
Regents of Spain
Roman Catholic monarchs
Spanish generals
Viceroys of Catalonia
Viceroys of Naples
Viceroys of Sicily
Sons of kings